The Colóns may refer to:
The Colóns (2002–2010) - the professional wrestling tag team of Carlito and Primo
Primo and Epico - the professional wrestling tag team of Primo and Epico